Matt Gallagher is a Canadian film director, producer and cinematographer from Windsor, Ontario.

Career
Gallagher has directed documentaries for History Television, CBC, BBC, The History Channel the Food Network and W Network.

In 2000, he won two Golden Sheaf Awards, Best of Festival and Best Short Subject, at the Yorkton Film Festival for the film Cass.

In 2006 he was nominated for a Gemini Award for Best History Documentary Program for the CBC documentary Vimy: Carved in Stone. In 2013 Gallagher's documentary Grinders was nominated for the Canadian Screen Award Best Direction in a Documentary Program or Series.

In 2019, Gallagher won the  $50,000 Rogers Audience Award for Best Canadian Documentary for Prey at the Hot Docs Canadian International Documentary Festival and the DGC Special Jury Prize - Canadian Feature Documentary. In 2019, he also won Directors Guild of Canada's award for Best Picture Editing - Documentary and the Allan King Award for Excellence in Documentary for Prey.

In 2020 Prey was nominated for Best Feature Length Documentary and Best Editing in a Feature Documentary at the 8th Canadian Screen Awards. His 2021 television documentary Dispatches from a Field Hospital was a nominee for the Donald Brittain Award at the 10th Canadian Screen Awards in 2022.

Filmography

 Cass, 1999
 Vimy: Carved in Stone (CBC), 2006
 Vimy Ridge: From Heaven to Hell, 2007
 You Gotta Have a Gimmick (NFB), 2009
 Grinders, 2011
 In Her Footsteps: The Story of Kateri Tekakwitha, 2012
 How to Prepare for Prison, 2016
 Prey, 2019
 Dispatches from a Field Hospital, 2021

References

External links
 Border City Pictures

Canadian cinematographers
Canadian documentary film directors
Film producers from Ontario
Film directors from Ontario
People from Windsor, Ontario
Living people
Year of birth missing (living people)